Johnny Mac or John McEnroe (born 1959) is an American retired tennis player.

Johnny Mac may also refer to:
 John McDonald (infielder) (born 1974), American baseball player
 John McDonnell (footballer) (born 1965), Irish football manager and former footballer